Central Finland is a region ( / ) in Finland. It borders the regions of Päijät-Häme, Pirkanmaa, South Ostrobothnia, Central Ostrobothnia, North Ostrobothnia, North Savo, and South Savo. The city of Jyväskylä is the regional centre and by far the largest city in the area.

The largest lake in the very water-based region is Lake Päijänne (1,080 km2). Other large lakes are Lake Keitele (490 km2), Lake Konnevesi (190 km2) and Lake Kivijärvi (150 km2). The highest point in the region is Kiiskilänmäki in the municipality of Multia, which reaches an altitude of 269 meters above sea level. Kuokanjoki, Finland's shortest river and one of the world's shortest rivers is in the region.

Central Finland has been one of the slowly growing regions in terms of population, but the growth has been based on the Jyväskylä sub-region's position as a significant growth center, and most of the region's municipalities are declining in population. Also, of these, Kyyjärvi has landed on the Finnish state's crisis financial management list due to its economic hardship. Luhanka, the smallest municipality in the whole Mainland Finland in terms of population, is also located in the region.

Historical provinces 
For history, geography and culture see: Tavastia, Savonia, Ostrobothnia

Municipalities 

The region of Central Finland is made up of 22 municipalities, of which six have city status (marked in bold).

Total: - 272,300 (2012 population)

Äänekoski sub-region:
 Äänekoski
Population: 
 Konnevesi
Population: 
Jämsä sub-region:
 Jämsä
Population: 
Joutsa sub-region:
 Joutsa
Population: 
 Luhanka (Luhango)
Population: 

Jyväskylä sub-region:
 Hankasalmi
Population: 
 Jyväskylä
Population: 
 Laukaa (Laukas)
Population: 
 Muurame
Population: 
 Petäjävesi
Population: 
 Toivakka
Population: 
 Uurainen (Urais)
Population: 
Keuruu sub-region:
 Keuruu (Keuru)
Population: 
 Multia
Population: 

Saarijärvi-Viitasaari sub-region:
 Kannonkoski
Population: 
 Karstula
Population: 
 Kivijärvi
Population: 
 Kyyjärvi
Population: 
 Saarijärvi
Population: 
 Kinnula
Population: 
 Pihtipudas
Population: 
 Viitasaari
Population:

Politics 
Results of the 2019 Finnish parliamentary election in Central Finland:

Centre Party  19.82%.
Social Democratic Party  18.92%.
Finns Party  18.04%.
National Coalition Party  12.77%.
Green League  11.43%.
Left Alliance  8.21%.
Christian Democrats  5.68%.
Movement Now   2.77%.
Blue Reform   0.46%.
Seven Star Movement   0.25%.
Other parties   1.65%,

References

External links 

Central Finland Regional Council
Central Finland Human Technology Region
Central Finland Official Tourist Guide

 
Western Finland Province
Central